Prabin Hazarika is an Asom Gana Parishad politician from Assam. He has been elected in Assam Legislative Assembly election in 1996 and 2011 from Biswanath.

References 

Living people
Asom Gana Parishad politicians
Year of birth missing (living people)
Assam MLAs 2011–2016
Assam MLAs 1996–2001